The Sensualist: a cautionary tale is a novella by the Anglo-Indian author  Ruskin Bond which created a stir when it was charged with obscenity in Mumbai. It first appeared over twenty years ago and was then first published in book form in 1999 by Penguin Book India.

It was included along with A handful of nuts in the volume Strangers in the nights : two novellas; this volume was translated into Hindi
and included in the anthology of his fiction.

References

Indian novellas
Controversies in India
Obscenity controversies in literature
Works by Ruskin Bond